Zeeshan Maqsood (born 24 October 1987) is a Pakistani-born cricketer who plays for the Oman national cricket team and is the captain of the national team. In January 2022, Maqsood was named as the ICC Men's Associate Cricketer of the Year by the International Cricket Council (ICC).

Biography
He played in the 2014 ICC World Cricket League Division Four tournament. He made his Twenty20 International debut for Oman against Afghanistan in the 2015 ICC World Twenty20 Qualifier tournament on 25 July 2015. He was the leading run-scorer in the 2016 ICC World Cricket League Division Five, with a total 350 runs during the tournament. He made his List A debut for Oman in their three-match series against the United Arab Emirates in October 2016.

In January 2018, he was named in Oman's squad for the 2018 ICC World Cricket League Division Two tournament. In August 2018, he was named the captain of Oman's squad for the 2018 Asia Cup Qualifier tournament. In October 2018, he was named as the captain of Oman's squad for the 2018 ICC World Cricket League Division Three tournament. In December 2018, he was named as the captain of Oman's team for the 2018 ACC Emerging Teams Asia Cup.

In March 2019, he was named as the captain of Oman's team for the 2019 ICC World Cricket League Division Two tournament in Namibia. Oman finished in the top four places in the tournament, therefore gaining One Day International (ODI) status. Maqsood made his ODI debut for Oman on 27 April 2019, against Namibia, in the tournament's final.

In September 2019, he was named as the captain of Oman's squad for the 2019 ICC T20 World Cup Qualifier tournament. On 11 February 2020, against the United States, he scored his first century in ODI cricket, with 109 runs.

In September 2021, he was named as the captain of Oman's squad for the 2021 ICC Men's T20 World Cup.

References

External links
 

1987 births
Living people
Omani cricketers
Oman One Day International cricketers
Oman Twenty20 International cricketers
Place of birth missing (living people)
Pakistani emigrants to Oman
Pakistani expatriates in Oman
People from Chichawatni